Bodo Ferl (born 20 January 1963) is an East German bobsledder who competed from the mid to late 1980s. He won two medals in the four-man event at the FIBT World Championships with a silver in 1985 and a bronze in 1989.

Ferl also finished eighth in the four-man event at the 1988 Winter Olympics in Calgary.

References

External links
Bobsleigh four-man world championship medalists since 1930
Winter Olympic four-man bobsleigh results: 1988-2002

1963 births
Bobsledders at the 1988 Winter Olympics
German male bobsledders
Living people
Olympic bobsledders of East Germany